Alessandro Duè (born July 10, 1913) was an Italian professional football player.

1913 births
Year of death missing
Italian footballers
Serie A players
Pisa S.C. players
Juventus F.C. players
S.S.C. Bari players
Association football midfielders